A pagoda mast was a type of superstructure erected on a tripod mast that was common on Japanese capital ships that were reconstructed during the 1930s in a bid to improve their fighting performance. These modifications were deemed to be necessary by the Imperial Japanese Navy as a result of the "Battleships Holiday" that was imposed by the Washington Naval Treaty, which strictly limited the construction of new battleships.

Development 
Pagoda masts were built on existing tripod masts by adding searchlight and other platforms, lookouts and shelters upon each other, the result resembling a pagoda temple.

The additional platforms were supported on the ships' original tripod foremasts (a design also extensively used by the Royal Navy), which were suitably strengthened to bear the extra weight. As completed, the masts could reach  or more above the waterline.

Like the British Royal Navy, which was considered to be a likely enemy of Japan in the event of an armed conflict, the Imperial Japanese Navy wanted to prepare their warships for engaging in combat at night. Prior to the outbreak of World War II, powerful searchlights were placed on the pagoda masts for the purpose of illuminating enemy ships at night. However, during the early 1940s, the searchlights mounted on the pagoda became less important as new radar technology was developed that allowed a ship to aim and shoot at targets at night.

In the navies of Europe and the Americas, tall pagoda-style masts were generally frowned upon. Naval architects and sailors from the Western hemisphere claimed that the Japanese battleships were too "top-heavy" and critics often mocked these vessels by nicknaming them "Christmas Trees". Uniquely, the battleship Hiei received a prototype of the pagoda-style tower-mast that would eventually be used on the upcoming s, then still in the design phase, rather than the pagoda masts used on her sister ships and other modernized World War I-era capital ships.

Between World War I and World War II, the US Navy gradually phased out the lattice masts on its Standard-type battleships in favor of tripod masts, and after Pearl Harbor some of the salvaged battleships were reconstructed with masts similar to those on its post-treaty battleships.

Example
Chronological images of the Japanese battleship , showing the development of her pagoda mast over time.

References 

World War II naval ships of Japan
Shipbuilding
Nautical terminology
Battleships
Watercraft components